Graydon Smith is a Canadian politician, who was elected to the Legislative Assembly of Ontario in the 2022 provincial election. He represents the riding of Parry Sound—Muskoka as a member of the Progressive Conservative Party of Ontario.

Smith was formerly the mayor of Bracebridge, Ontario.

On June 24, Smith was appointed Minister of Natural Resources and Forestry by Lieutenant Governor Elizabeth Dowdeswell.

References 

Living people
Progressive Conservative Party of Ontario MPPs
21st-century Canadian politicians
Mayors of places in Ontario
People from Bracebridge, Ontario
Year of birth missing (living people)
Members of the Executive Council of Ontario